The following is a list of spy films in alphabetical order.

Overview and history
The spy film, also known as the spy thriller, is a genre of film that deals with the subject of fictional espionage, either in a realistic way (such as the adaptations of John le Carré) or as a basis for fantasy (such as many James Bond films). Many novels in the spy fiction genre have been adapted as films, including works by John Buchan, le Carré, Ian Fleming (Bond) and Len Deighton. It is a significant aspect of British cinema, with leading British directors such as Alfred Hitchcock and Carol Reed making notable contributions and many films set in the British Secret Service.

Spy films show the espionage activities of government agents and their risk of being discovered by their enemies. From the Nazi espionage thrillers of the 1940s to the James Bond films of the 1960s and to the high-tech blockbusters of today, the spy film has always been popular with audiences worldwide. Offering a combination of exciting escapism, technological thrills, and exotic locales, many spy films combine the action and science fiction genres, presenting clearly delineated heroes for audiences to root for and villains for them to hate. They may also involve elements of political thrillers. However, there are many that are comedic (mostly action comedy films if they fall under that genre).

James Bond is the most famous of film spies, but there were also more serious, probing works like le Carré's The Spy Who Came in from the Cold that also emerged from the Cold War. As the Cold War ended, the newest villain became terrorism and more often involved the Middle East.

List of films

See also
List of films based on spy books
List of films featuring surveillance

References

Spy films
Lists of film lists